James John Morrish (20 January 1868 – 10 October 1956) was an Australian politician.

Born in Carmarthen, Wales, to master butcher Francis Morrish and Margaret Morgan, he arrived in New South Wales around 1896 and worked as a barman. He helped found the Hotel, Club, Restaurant and Caterers' Employees' Union and was its secretary. An early socialist, he was elected to the New South Wales Legislative Assembly as the Labor member for King in 1910 and served until 1917, although he left the party over the conscription issue and joined the Nationalist Party. In 1927 he was declared bankrupt; he was discharged in 1928. Morrish died at Hurstville in 1956.

References

1868 births
1956 deaths
Nationalist Party of Australia members of the Parliament of New South Wales
Members of the New South Wales Legislative Assembly
Welsh emigrants to Australia
People from Carmarthen
Australian Labor Party members of the Parliament of New South Wales